Leucine zipper putative tumor suppressor 1 is a protein that, in humans, is encoded by the LZTS1 gene.

In melanocytic cells LZTS1 gene expression may be regulated by MITF.

Interactions 
LZTS1 has been shown to interact with EEF1G.

References

Further reading